The Sauber C16 was the car with which the Sauber Formula One team competed in the 1997 Formula One season. It was initially driven by Johnny Herbert, who was in his second season with the team, and Nicola Larini. Larini's place in the team was secured via an arrangement that gave the team the previous year's Ferrari customer engines that were used in the F310 that scored three wins in 1996, badged as Petronas in deference to the team's major Malaysian sponsor.

However, Larini, Ferrari's test driver, was unhappy with the team's ambience and quit after five Grands Prix. Gianni Morbidelli was brought in as a replacement, but he broke his arm on two occasions during the year and had to be replaced by rookie Norberto Fontana whilst he recovered. All three drivers were comprehensively out-performed by Herbert.

Against some expectations, the car was competitive at the beginning of the season, but fell away slightly as the season progressed due to lack of development compared with better-funded rivals. Herbert's impressive season culminated in the team's third-ever podium finish at the 1997 Hungarian Grand Prix (where he also beat both works Ferraris). He scored all but one of the team's tally of points.

The team eventually finished seventh in the Constructors' Championship, with 16 points.

Many years later, some photos were leaked showing a top secret test carried out by Michael Schumacher in the C16 at Ferrari's test track at Fiorano in Italy. The test took place in September 1997 in a de-badged C16.

Complete Formula One results
(key) (results in bold indicate pole position)

References
AUTOCOURSE 1997-98, Henry, Alan (ed.), Hazleton Publishing Ltd. (1997) 

C16
1997 Formula One season cars